Åke Ohberg (20 July 1905 – 18 July 1975) was a Swedish actor and film director. He appeared in about 30 roles in films between 1932 and 1961.

Ohberg was born to Johan and Hulda Ohberg in Västerås, Sweden.

Marriage and Family
He married actress Birgit Chenon but that marriage did not last. He married actress Peggy Lindberg in 1937, a union that lasted until his death. They had two children, a daughter Ingert and a son Anders.

Selected filmography
 Servant's Entrance (1932)
 Two Men and a Widow (1933)
 The Dangerous Game (1933)
 The Marriage Game (1935)
 Kungen kommer (1936)
 Art for Art's Sake (1938)
 Landstormens lilla Lotta (1939)
 Frestelse (1940)
 Hanna in Society (1940)
 They Staked Their Lives (1940)
 With Open Arms (1940)
 Snapphanar (1941)
Lucky Young Lady (1941)
 Nothing Is Forgotten (1942)
 Elvira Madigan (1943)
 Stopp! Tänk på något annat (1944)
 Blizzard (1944)
 The Rose of Tistelön (1945)
 Brita in the Merchant's House (1946)
 Dynamite (1947)
 The People of Simlang Valley (1947)
 Vi flyr på Rio (1949)
 My Friend Oscar (1951)
 The Chieftain of Göinge (1953)
 The Summer Wind Blows (1955)

References

External links

1905 births
1975 deaths
People from Västerås
Swedish male film actors
Swedish film directors
Burials at Norra begravningsplatsen
20th-century Swedish male actors